The Giant King (released as The Robot Giant in some countries and Yak in Thailand) is a 2015 Thai 3D computer-animated comic science fiction children's/family film starring Santisuk Promsiri, Kreadtisuk Udomnak, Boribroon Junrieng, Weranut Tippayamontol, Pawanrat Naksuriya, Caninap Sirisawut, Udom Tarpanich, Bawriboon Chanreuang, Nathan LaVelle, Santisuk Promsiri, Udom Taephanit, Kerttisak Udomnak and Chris Wegoda, directed by Prapas Cholsaranont and Chaiporn Panichrutiwong and distributed by Workpoint Picture. The story is a futuristic adaptation of the fable of Tosakan and Hanuman the Monkey King from the Thai version of the Ramayana, with robots for the main characters. Literary reputation in Asia for the last 6 years and budget over 100 million baht. It was released on 25 December 2015.

Plot
A re-interpretation of Ramayana, the Thai animation film tells the story of a giant robot, Na Kiew, who's left wandering in a barren wasteland after a great war. Na Kiew meets Jao Phuek, a puny tin robot who's lost his memory and is now stuck with his new big friend. Together they set out across the desert populated by metal scavengers, to look for Ram, the creator of all robots.

Cast

Original version
 Santisuk Promsiri
 Kreadtisuk Udomnak
 Boribroon Junrieng
 Weranut Tippayamontol
 Pawanrat Naksuriya
 Caninap Sirisawut
 Udom Tarpanich
 Bawriboon Chanreuang
 Santisuk Promsiri
 Udom Taephanit
 Kerttisak Udomnak
 Chris Wegoda

1st English version
 Todd (tongdee) Lavelle as Big Green/Tossakan/The old mechanic/Brooks/9 Heads/Planet/Fireman/Fire foreman
 Hugh Gallagher as Whitey/Hanuman
 Stephen Thomas as Kum/Kok/Bartender/Mayor/Dr. Watt/Fireman/Work foreman/Old woman
 Hailey Rodee as Rusty
 Tabitha King as Sadayuu
 Vincent Junior Bergeron as Mayor's son
 Sean Bergeron as Friend of Mayor's son/Boy
 Chris Wegoda as Fireman/Work foreman/Old woman
 Mariam Tokarsky as Mayor's wife/Woman was robbed/Cat's owner
 Ananya LO as Girl

2nd English version
 Bella Thorne as Pinky
 Russell Peters as Zork
 Meg DeAngelis as Rusty
 Gregg Sulkin as Flapper
 Carlos PenaVega as Krudd
 Romeo Lacoste as Bartender
 Nathan Barnatt as Scrap Metal Dealer
 Mark Steines as Bob the Mechanic 
 Gina Briganti as Mama Robot
 Joseph Pfeiffer as Dad Robot
 Dan O'Day-McClellan as Mayor
 Mychal Simka as Various robots (uncredited)

Characters
 Na Khiaw (Big Green/Tosakan, Zork in the U.S. version)
 Ravana
 Brooks
 Phuak (Whitey/Hanuman, Pinky in the U.S. version)
 Sanim (Rusty in both English versions)
 Hanuman
 Sadayuu (Flapper in the U.S. version)
 Kok
 Guard
 Father
 French Construction Worker
 Mexican Worker
 Tasokan

Awards
The Best Directors are Prapas Cholsaranont and Chaiporn Panichrutiwong, The Best Score is Jakkrapat Iamnoon, The Best Editors are Smith Timsawat, Punlop Sinjaroen and Prapas Cholsaranont, The Best Art Direction is Chaiporn Panichrutiwong, The Best Sound is made by Richard Hocks and The Best Original Song is "Kerd Ma Pen Phuen Ther" performed by Apiwat Eurthavornsuk.

Movie and Storyline
The makers for the film in Sound Department are Sergei Groshev, Richard Hocks, Jérémy Rodeschini and Warren Santiago. The makers for the film in Animation Department are Watcharadon Chanachina and Suwajana Noochniyom Janajina and the makers for the film in Editorial Department and Other Crew are Steve Calalang and Chris Wegoda. The Music for the film was composed by Jakkrapat Iamnoon, The film is directed by Prapas Cholsaranont	and it stars Bawriboon Chanreuang, Santisuk Promsiri, Udom Taephanit, Kerttisak Udomnak and Chris Wegoda. A re-interpretation of Ramayana, the Thai animation film tells the story of a giant robot, Na Kiew, who's left wandering in a barren wasteland after a great war. Na Kiew meets Jao Phuek, a puny tin robot who's lost his memory and is now stuck with his new big friend. Together they set out across the desert populated by metal scavengers, to look for Ram, the creator of all robots. The storyline for the film is written by Anonymous. The film is produced by Work Point Entertainment and distributed by Sahamongkol Film International and Eagle Entertainment. Also known names for the film are called The Giant King and Yak.

Release
The film was theatrically released in 2012 and 2013 in Thailand and Russia in cinemas and in Australia and New Zealand at the DVD Premieres. Two English dubs of the film were produced, one in its home country of Thailand, and another in 2015 by Grindstone Entertainment Group. While the original English dub stays very close to the Thai script, the Grindstone dub makes heavy changes to the story, with all the references to Ramayana removed, along with changing some of the character names, personalities, and even some of the genders of characters.

Home media
Yak: The Giant King was released on Blu-ray by Happy. Outside of Thailand, it was first released in Australia on DVD by Eagle Entertainment on December 28, 2013. The Grindstone dub was released straight-to-DVD by Lionsgate on December 22, 2015.

Theme song
"We Were Born To Be Friends"
Artist: ROOM 39
Composition: Stamp

References

External links
 
 

2012 films
2012 animated films
Thai animated films
Animated films based on Ramayana
Animated films about robots